Cranberry Marsh may refer to: 

 Cranberry Marsh, Wisconsin 
 Cranberry Marsh/Starratt Wildlife Management Area in British Columbia, Canada
 Cranberry Marsh in Lynde Shores Conservation Area in Ontario, Canada